The North White Carniolan dialect is a Slovene dialect spoken in White Carniola north of Dobliče and Griblje. The dialect was partially influenced by immigrants of Serbo-Croatian origin that moved to this area in the 15th and 16th centuries. The dialect borders the Lower Carniolan dialect to the north, Mixed Kočevje subdialects to the west, and South White Carniolan dialect to the south, as well as Prigorje and Goran Kajkavian to the east and Eastern Herzegovinian Shtokavian to the northeast. The dialect belongs to the Lower Carniolan dialect group, and it evolved from Lower Carniolan dialect base.

Geographical distribution 
The border between the South and North White Carniolan dialects is rather clear; it was already defined by Tine Logar. It follows the line from Jelševnik to Krasinec, but runs a bit south of Črnomelj. The borders with other Slovene dialects are also geographical borders; the Gorjanci Hills correspond to the border with the Lower Carniolan dialect, and the Kočevje Rog Plateau with the mixed Kočevje subdialects. The border between Slovene and Serbo–Croatian is deemed to follow national borders. Notable settlements include Stražnji Vrh, Črnomelj, Ručetna Vas, Semič, Gradac, Metlika, and Radovica.

History 
White Carniola was inhabited by Slovenes after the 13th century, and even then it was quite remote from other Slovenes on the Kočevje Rog Plateau to the west and in the Gorjanci Hills to the north. The immigration of the Gottschee Germans left the Slovenes even more closely connected to Croatia. However, they still maintained contact with other Slovenes that lived on the other side of the Gorjanci Hills to the north. Differentiation between the North and South White Carniolan dialects occurred in the 15th and 16th centuries, when the Ottomans started attacking Bosnia and Dalmatia. Because of this, White Carniolans started moving north of the Gorjanci Hills, and the mostly cleared region of southern White Carniola, especially along the Kolpa River, was newly inhabited by immigrants from Serbia, Bosnia and Herzegovina, and Croatia. The White Carniolan dialect then formed from a mix of the old White Carniolan dialect, Serbo-Croatian dialects, and dialects from newly settled Slovenes after the Ottoman invasions. Serbo-Croatian influence was the most prominent in the south, whereas in the north it had negligible influence. Therefore, today the White Carniolan dialect is split based on how much influence it received from Serbo-Croatian.

Accentual changes 
The dialect lost the difference between high- and low-pitched accent, both on long and short vowels, which are still differentiated. It also underwent six accentual changes, which are also present in South White Carniolan:  → ,  → ,  /  →  / ,  → , and  → .

Phonology 
Serbo-Croatian immigrants altered the dialect to a much lesser extent than in the South White Carniolan dialect. There are some partially altered microdialects, but most of them are more or less unaltered. All vowel changes are expected for a Slovene dialect, and vowel reduction is present. The Slovenian linguist Jože Toporišič even states that there was no early mixing with Croatian in this dialect.

Alpine Slavic  and non-final  evolved into  around Semič and into  elsewhere. The vowel  evolved into . Similarly,  and non-final  and  evolved into  in the west and into  in the east. Non-final  and  evolved into , and in the past  was also present in the west.

Before the stress, the vowels  and  evolved into , and  commonly turns into . Akanye is not common. After the stress, the vowel  evolved into  and  into . In Črnomelj, unstressed  turned into . Diphthongs  and  simplified into i.

In Črnomelj, short  and  followed by  simplified into .

Velar  was retained in the southeastern microdialects, and palatal consonants remained palatal in some microdialects, particularly those in the east.

Morphology 
The dialect retained neuter gender, but it lost dual forms. Adjectives are mainly compared periphrastically, but all suffixes are still occasionally in use. The pluperfect is not in use anymore, and the preterite and future forms are expressed with  + l-participle.

The instrumental plural was replaced by locative plural forms in the eastern microdialects.

Vocabulary 
The vocabulary of the Črnomelj microdialect was collected by Janez Kramarič and published in Slovar črnomaljskega narečnega govora.

References

Bibliography 

 
 

Slovene dialects